Arnamul is a stack off the west coast of Mingulay in the Western Isles, Scotland. Although precipitous, sheep were grazed on its relatively flat summit during the human occupation of Mingulay.

Haswell-Smith (2004) states that the name means "erne mound". Mac an Tailleir (2003) does not provide a derivation, although he quotes "Arnabol" as meaning "eagle farm" or "Arne's farm" from the Norse.

It was ascended by a party of hill baggers in April 2018.

Footnotes

Barra Isles
Stacks of Scotland
Uninhabited islands of the Outer Hebrides